"Baby Mama" is a song recorded by American singer Brandy, featuring rapper Chance the Rapper. It was written by Norwood, Chance, Akil King, and Kimberly "Kaydence" Krysiuk, while production was helmed by Hit Boy and Norwood. It was released as the lead single from Norwood's seventh studio album B7 (2020) The bass-heavy, horn-influenced uptempo R&B track pays homage to single mothers, with Norwood specifically celebrating her love for daughter Sy'rai. "Baby Mama" was released to all digital outlets on May 1, 2020.

Background and promotion
"Baby Mama" was officially announced as the lead single for Norwood's upcoming seventh studio album on American talk show, The Talk in March 2020. The song's release was postponed due to the COVID-19 pandemic. The song was officially released digitally on May 1, 2020. Norwood described the track to have been influenced by her relationship with her daughter, serving as a somewhat tribute to hardworking mothers across the world. Furthermore, Norwood revealed: “My new single is about embracing the strength and fortitude needed not only in motherhood, but in life,” the singer said in a press release. “I am thrilled that Chance joined me on this track, and I hope my fans find it as uplifting as I intended it to be!”.

Chart performance 
"Baby Mama" debuted at number 23 on the US Billboard Adult R&B Songs in the week ending May 9, 2020 and eventually going on to peak at number seven on July 20, 2020. This marked her first list entry as a leading artist since "Wildest Dreams" in 2012. In addition, it reached number 27 on the R&B/Hip-Hop Airplay chart. On May 16, 2020, the single entered and peaked on Billboard's R&B Digital Song Sales chart at number 10, making it Norwood's fifth entry on that chart. Elsewhere, on the week ending June 22, 2020, the single peaked at number 44 on the US Urban Airplay chart.

Music video

Background and release

An accompanying music video was directed by Derek Blanks and Frank Gatson Jr., the latter of whom Norwood had frequently collaborated with throughout her career, including videos for "I Wanna Be Down" (1994) and “Put It Down" (2012). "Baby Mama" was filmed at the Fat Eye Studios in Los Angeles in the week of January 29, 2020, prior to social distancing and the COVID-19 pandemic. The video premiered on BET outlets on May 4, 2020, and uploaded online soon after.

Synopsis
The video draws inspiration from Fosse-style choreography and the 1969 musical film Sweet Charity, specifically from actor Sammy Davis Jr. performance of the song "The Rhythm of Life". The video opens with Norwood and her dancers in an open warehouse surrounded by classic cars. Donning an array of colorful suits and jackets, Norwood performs a series of dance sequences with the dancers, fusing contemporary jazz and hip-hop stylings. Chance the Rapper appears in the video, interacting with Norwood through an orange two-seater.

Live performances
Norwood first performed the song live on Good Morning America during their 2020 Spring Concert Series. She live streamed her performance from her home due to the COVID-19 pandemic.  Norwood live-streamed a performance of the song on The Talk on May 12, 2020.

Credits and personnel
Credits taken from the liner notes of B7.

Andy Barnes – engineer
Chancelor Bennett – vocals, writer
LaShawn Daniels – producer
Antonio Dixon – engineer
Chauncey Alexander "Hit-Boy" Hollis – producer, writer
Jaycen Joshua – mastering, mixing

Akil King – writer
Kimberley Krysiuk – writer
Brandy Norwood – producer, vocals, writer
Sy'rai Smith – background vocals, writer
Earl "Ejay" Washington – engineer

Charts

Weekly charts

Year-end charts

Release history

References

2020 singles
Brandy Norwood songs
Songs written by Brandy Norwood
2020 songs
Songs written by Chance the Rapper
MNRK Music Group singles
Songs written by Hit-Boy
Song recordings produced by Hit-Boy